ETG Designers and Consultants S.C. formerly known as ETG Designers and Consultants PLC is an architectural design and consulting firm founded in 1996 by Eshetu T. Gelan (Ph.D.). It is headquartered in Addis Ababa, Ethiopia. ETG is known for its work in multiple governmental, non-governmental, and private projects.

Foundation and internal organization 
ETG was founded in 1996 as a privately owned architectural firm in Ethiopia with an initial capital of 10,000 Ethiopian Birr (ETB). ETG transformed from a privately owned firm into an employee-owned share company in the late 2010s.

Services

Building design 

ETG designed and supervised the headquarters for Wegagen Bank. The project was finalized within six years and had a budget of almost 1 billion Ethiopian Birr (ETB). For the contract administration and supervision, ETG worked closely with China Jiangxi Corporation for International Economic & Technical Cooperation (CJIC) . Following the completion of Wegagen Bank the company has designed several financial institutions such as a 36-story tower mixed-use building for the Amhara Credit and Savings Institute.

Contract administration and supervision 

ETG was responsible for the design and contract administration of Adama stadium, an 80,000-seat stadium with a budget of 1.7 billion ETB ($82 million). In addition, ETG was the contract administrator and supervisor for the long-awaited expansion of St. Paul's maternity and children hospital and  St. Paul's Hospital Millennium Medical College Construction Project.The projects had an approximate budget of 178 million ETB. The company also undertook a project by the Federal Housing Corporation which included 8 buildings in various sites totaling to 435 apartment houses. The project was stated to have a budget of 1.8 billion ETB.

Environment, water supply, and sanitation 
The organization has been a member of the U.S. Green Building Council  (USBGC) since late 2019. U.S. Green Building Council is an organization that is dedicated to achieving environmental sustainability within the construction sector through the LEED (Leadership in Energy and Environmental Design) certification program.

Corporate social responsibility 
ETG Designers and Consultants established  the Center of Excellence for Environment, Design, City planning and Construction (CeDC) as part of its Corporate Social Responsibility initiatives. The center is dedicated to giving free training and  new research to raise environmental awareness within the design, urban planning, and construction sectors.

References 

Architecture in Ethiopia
Companies based in Addis Ababa
Consulting firms established in 1996
Employee-owned companies
Architecture firms
Engineering consulting firms